Richard Ackermann (17 November 1869 – 27 September 1930) was a German naval officer during World War I. 

Richard Ackermann was born on 17 November 1869 in Weeskenhof. He served as the commanding officer of the battlecruiser SMS Goeben from April 1914 to January 1918. He alone commanded the ship during an engagement in the Black Sea against the Russians in May 1915. Ackermann died on 27 September 1930 in Charlottenburg.

Citations

References 

 
 
 

1869 births
1930 deaths
Imperial German Navy personnel of World War I